Edward Byrne may refer to:
Edward Byrne (police officer) (1966–1988), murdered police officer in the New York City Police Department
Edward Abraham Byrne (1864–1938), Irish-American civil engineer
Edward 'Doc' Byrne, journalist and newspaper editor
Edward Gerald Byrne (1912–2003), New Brunswick politician
Edward Joseph Byrne (1872–1940), Irish prelate of the Roman Catholic Church
Ed Byrne (comedian) (born 1972), Irish comedian
Ed Byrne (musician), American trombonist, composer and bandleader
Ed Byrne (neuroscientist) (born 1952), neuroscientist and Principal of King's College London
Ed Byrne (politician) (born 1963), Canadian politician
Ed Byrne (rugby union) (born 1993), Irish rugby union player
Eddie Byrne (1911–1981), Irish actor
Eddie Byrne (footballer) (born 1951), Irish footballer
Eddie Byrne (hurler) (1905–1944), Irish hurler
Ned Byrne (born 1948), Irish hurler and rugby player

See also
Edward Burns (disambiguation)
Edward Burne-Jones (1833–1898), English artist and designer
Edd Byrnes (1932–2020), American actor
Edmund Widdrington Byrne (1844–1904), British judge and politician